Austin da Luz (born October 9, 1987) is an American former professional soccer player.

Career

Youth and college
Da Luz attended St. Stephen's Episcopal School Soccer Academy in Austin, Texas, where he was exposed to high levels of intensive training and competition on a regular basis and was able to travel and participate in international tournament play. Da Luz played college soccer at Wake Forest University from 2006 to 2009 where he appeared in 80 games scoring 13 goals and adding 39 assists. He was a member of Wake Forest's 2007 NCAA College Cup Championship team.

During his college years da Luz also played for Austin Aztex U23 in the USL Premier Development League.

Professional
Da Luz was drafted in the first round (14th overall) of the 2010 MLS SuperDraft by New York Red Bulls. In the semi-finals of the pre-season 2010 Walt Disney World Pro Soccer Classic, da Luz scored the winning goal in the penalty kick shoot-out against the Houston Dynamo, topping off the score at 6-5 and helping the New York Red Bulls reach the final.

He made his professional debut on April 27, 2010, in a U.S. Open Cup game against Philadelphia Union, and made his MLS debut against the Vancouver Whitecaps on May 28, 2011. On June 19, 2011, da Luz scored his first goal for New York and assisted on a Thierry Henry goal in a 3-3 draw with Portland Timbers.

On July 18, 2011, da Luz was traded to D.C. United for use of an international roster slot for the remainder of 2011.

Da Luz signed with NASL club Carolina RailHawks on April 4, 2012, and stayed with the club for two seasons. In 2014, he signed with USL Pro side Orlando City. He was released upon the conclusion of the 2014 season, a casualty of the Orlando City's transition to Major League Soccer. He re-signed with Carolina RailHawks after his release by Orlando City.

On August 13, 2019, da Luz announced he would retire at the end of the 2019 USL Championship season.

Post-retirement

For the 2020 USL Championship season, da Luz became a color commentator for North Carolina FC television broadcasts.

Career statistics

References

External links
 
 

1987 births
Living people
American soccer players
Association football midfielders
Austin Aztex U23 players
D.C. United players
Major League Soccer players
New York Red Bulls draft picks
New York Red Bulls players
North American Soccer League players
North Carolina FC players
Orlando City SC (2010–2014) players
Soccer players from North Carolina
Sportspeople from Winston-Salem, North Carolina
USL Championship players
USL League Two players
Wake Forest Demon Deacons men's soccer players